Shanhai may refer to:

Shanhai Pass, pass of the Great Wall of China
Shanhai Jing, or Collection of the Mountains and Seas, Chinese classic text

See also
Shanghai